The Iowa Department of Corrections is a state agency operating prisons in Iowa. It has its headquarters in Des Moines.

Facilities

The Iowa Department of Corrections operates nine adult facilities through the state.  Iowa does not contract with private prisons.

 Anamosa State Penitentiary - Anamosa
 Clarinda Correctional Facility - Clarinda
 Fort Dodge Correctional Facility - Fort Dodge
 Iowa Correctional Institution for Women - Mitchellville
 Iowa Medical and Classification Center - Oakdale
 Iowa State Penitentiary - Fort Madison
 Mount Pleasant Correctional Facility - Mount Pleasant
 Newton Correctional Facility - unincorporated Jasper County, near Newton
 North Central Correctional Facility - Rockwell City

Fallen officers

Since the establishment of the Iowa Department of Corrections, 7 officers have died in the line of duty.

See also

 List of law enforcement agencies in Iowa
 List of United States state correction agencies
 Lists of United States state prisons
 Prison

References

External links

State law enforcement agencies of Iowa
State corrections departments of the United States
 
Iowa